Jan Claesz Rietschoof (1651–1719) was a Dutch Golden Age painter of seascapes.

Biography
According to Houbraken he learned painting first from  Abraham Liedts, and later from the renowned seascape painter Ludolf Bakhuizen.

Paintings
His paintings today hang in various museums in the Netherlands. He taught his son Hendrik Rietschoof (1678–1747) how to paint; Hendrik's seascape and seaport drawings are online at the Amsterdam archives. In Hoorn he was a contemporary of the flower painter Jacob Rootius, who was the son of the influential schutterstuk painter Jan Albertsz Rotius.

References

 Jan Claesz. Rietschoof in the RKD

1651 births
1719 deaths
Dutch Golden Age painters
Dutch male painters
Dutch marine artists
People from Hoorn